The 1971 California Golden Bears football team was an American football team that represented the University of California, Berkeley in the Pacific-8 Conference (Pac-8) during the 1971 NCAA University Division football season. In their eighth year under head coach Ray Willsey, the Golden Bears compiled a 6–5 record (4–3 against Pac-8 opponents), finished in a tie for third place in the Pac-8, and were outscored by their opponents by a combined total of 262 to 186.

The team's statistical leaders included Jay Cruze with 1,284 passing yards, Steve Kemnitzer with 686 rushing yards, and Steve Sweeney with 579 receiving yards.

Schedule

Personnel

References

California
California Golden Bears football seasons
California Golden Bears football